

League Standings

Ukraine

Ranking 1-14th

Ranking 15-27th

See also
 Soviet Second League B

1970
4
Soviet
Soviet